Cleveland Township is a township in Le Sueur County, Minnesota, United States.  The population was 615 at the 2000 census.

History
Cleveland Township was organized in 1858, and named after Cleveland, Ohio.

Geography

Demographics
As of the census of 2000, there were 615 people, 218 households, and 173 families residing in the township. The population density was 18.4 people per square mile (7.1/km2). There were 301 housing units at an average density of 9.0/sq mi (3.5/km2).  The racial makeup of the township was 96.10% White, 2.44% Asian, 0.33% from other races, and 1.14% from two or more races. Hispanic or Latino of any race were 0.49% of the population.

There were 218 households, out of which 34.9% had children under the age of 18 living with them, 71.1% were married couples living together, 4.6% had a female householder with no husband present, and 20.6% were non-families. 16.1% of all households were made up of individuals, and 6.0% had someone living alone who was 65 years of age or older. The average household size was 2.82 and the average family size was 3.14.

In the township the population was spread out, with 25.7% under the age of 18, 6.8% from 18 to 24, 26.0% from 25 to 44, 29.9% from 45 to 64, and 11.5% who were 65 years of age or older. The median age was 41 years. For every 100 females, there were 114.3 males.  For every 100 females age 18 and over, there were 111.6 males.

The median income for a household in the township was $50,972, and the median income for a family was $51,250. Males had a median income of $31,900 versus $22,019 for females. The per capita income for the township was $21,314.  About 0.6% of families and 1.6% of the population were below the poverty line, including none of those under the age of eighteen or sixty-five or over.

References

Townships in Le Sueur County, Minnesota
Townships in Minnesota
1858 establishments in Minnesota Territory
Populated places established in 1858